Kalinagar is a town and a nagar panchayat in Pilibhit district in the Indian state of Uttar Pradesh.
Kalinagar is a new tehsil of district Pilibhit
Pin code -262124

Geography
It has an average elevation of 184 metres (603 feet).

Demographics
As of the 2001 Census of India, Kalinagar had a population of 9,984. Males constitute 53% of the population and females 47%. Kalinagar has an average literacy rate of 34%, lower than the national average of 59.5%: male literacy is 45%, and female literacy is 22%. In Kalinagar, 20% of the population is under 6 years of age.

References

Cities and towns in Pilibhit district